Stacy Marshall Compton (born May 26, 1967) is a NASCAR former team owner and former driver. He is a former co-owner of Bobby Hamilton Racing-Virginia in the Craftsman Truck Series, and is a former racing analyst for ESPN full-time. Before he ran in NASCAR, Compton was a successful short track racer in Virginia.

Early career 
Compton was born in Hurt, Virginia, and grew up racing in Virginia with his focus on late models in local racing divisions. Eventually, he moved up to the NASCAR Winston Racing Series, and won 36 races in seven years of late model competition. During this time, Compton also hosted a TV show dedicated to covering Virginia races. In 1996, Compton made his debut in a major NASCAR series driving for Dean Monroe, Monroe bought Alan Dillard team beginning 1996, when he qualified in 9th place for the Goody's Headache Powder 500 at Martinsville Speedway in the Winston Cup series. He finished 33rd that day after suffering brake failure. He ran one other race during his rookie season, the fall Martinsville event. He finished 33rd in that race as well.

1997–1999 
In 1997, Compton signed up with a new team, Impact Motorsports, to run the No. 86 Ford F-150 for the NASCAR Craftsman Truck Series Rookie of the Year Award. During his initial Truck Series season, Compton had three Top 5 finishes and a 13th-place finish in the final points standings, but fell well short of the top rookie award. For the 1998 season, in the third race of the season held at Phoenix International Raceway, Compton won his first career pole position, and finished in third in the race. The next week at Portland Speedway, he led all but two laps and won his first career Truck Series race. He got another win later that season at Heartland Park Topeka. He finished seventh in the final points standings and was named the Most Popular Driver. Compton had high hopes for 1999 season as Impact switched to Dodge Rams and getting a teammate in Randy Tolsma, but he failed to go to victory lane that season, although he did finish fourth in points. Late that season, Compton began competing in some Winston Cup races for Melling Racing. Soon afterwards, Melling announced that Compton would driver their No. 9 Ford Taurus in the Winston Cup Series in 2000 season.

2000–2002 
Compton struggled during his first year in the Cup series, as his best finish was 16th at New Hampshire International Speedway. In the summer Michigan race, he crashed during qualifying and suffered minor injuries. He was replaced by Bobby Hillin Jr. at the following event. Compton ended the year 38th in points.

In 2001, Melling switched the car's number and manufacture to 92 and Dodge and had a new crew chief with Chad Knaus. Compton started the season by qualifying on the outside pole next to Bill Elliott in the Daytona 500 and went on to score a 10th-place finish. At the next restrictor-plate race at Talladega Superspeedway, he won his first career Cup pole position, but finished last due to mechanical issues. After winning a second career pole at Talladega, he was only able to improve his points position by five spots. At the end of the year, sponsorship problems at Melling forced him to look elsewhere for a job.

In the 2002 season, Compton signed with A.J. Foyt Racing to drive the No. 14 Pontiac, replacing Ron Hornaday Jr. He had a best finish of 18th when his sponsor Conseco filed for Chapter 11 bankruptcy. He was let go after the New England 300. He returned to Melling for one race before competing in two for BAM Racing at the end of the season. His last career Cup start for nine years came in the 2003 Pepsi 400 for Morgan-McClure Motorsports.

2001–2012
In 2001 at the GNC Live Well 300, Compton made his Busch Series debut with JTG Daugherty Racing, then known as ST Motorsports. He qualified 12th and finished 10th. For four consecutive seasons, Compton ran every Busch Series race with JTG. Although he did not win a Busch Series race, he has 33 career top-ten finishes and one pole position. His best points finish was a 9th in 2002.

Following the conclusion of the 2006 season, Compton was replaced by Marcos Ambrose and returned to the Truck Series, sharing the No. 09 Ford with Joey Clanton for nine races. In 2006, Compton founded Turn One Racing, LLC, as a way of promoting talented young drivers in the southeastern United States. He made a total of fourteen starts that season, ten for Wood Brothers/JTG, as well as one for Key Motorsports and three for Xpress Motorsports. He bought into Bobby Hamilton Racing in 2008, and was named driver of the No. 4 Dodge for the team during the season. After the race at Bristol Motor Speedway the No. 4 team shut down, leaving Compton out of a job. He drove the No. 60 Toyota for Wyler Racing in 2009, finishing with 8 top-tens and finishing 11th in points. Despite the new sponsorship, Jeff Wyler was unsure if the team would continue into 2010, so Compton and Turn One Racing bought the No. 60 from Wyler, though the team continued into 2010 under the Wyler Racing banner. Compton would split the No. 60 Truck with former Formula 1 driver Narain Karthikeyan and Red Bull development driver Cole Whitt, while also changing manufacturers to Chevrolet. Compton later took sole ownership of the team and renamed it Turn One Racing. Compton scored only five top tens and finished 20th in points. Karthikeyan left at the end of the year to drive for Hispania Racing in F1, while Safe Auto left the team to sponsor ThorSport Racing's No. 13 Truck.

2012 saw Compton expand his Truck Series team, Turn One Racing, into the Cup series with the No. 74 Chevrolet, starting at Bristol Motor Speedway in March He himself would attempt to qualify the car at Texas Motor Speedway but failed to do so. However, Compton did later manage to get into the field for the Pocono 400 in June. He has not raced since then.

Motorsports career results

NASCAR
(key) (Bold – Pole position awarded by qualifying time. Italics – Pole position earned by points standings or practice time. * – Most laps led.)

Sprint Cup Series

Daytona 500

Busch Series

Camping World Truck Series

ARCA Bondo/Mar-Hyde Series
(key) (Bold – Pole position awarded by qualifying time. Italics – Pole position earned by points standings or practice time. * – Most laps led.)

References

External links
 
 

Living people
1967 births
People from Pittsylvania County, Virginia
Racing drivers from Virginia
NASCAR drivers
Motorsport announcers
A. J. Foyt Enterprises drivers